Bambusa flexuosa is a species of Bambusa bamboo.

Synonyms

Distribution

Bambusa flexuosa is endemic to Guangdong province of China.

References 

flexuosa
Flora of Guangdong